This is a list of reggae musicians. This includes artists who have either been critical to the genre or have had a considerable amount of exposure (such as in the case of one that has been on a major label). Bands are listed by the first letter in their name (not including the words "a", "an", or "the"), and individuals are listed by last name.



A

The Abyssinians
The Aces
Glen Adams
Bryan Art (formerly known as, Brah Yhan, or Brayhan Art)
Admiral T
Yasus Afari
African Brothers
The Aggrovators
Aidonia
Aisha
Bobby Aitken
Laurel Aitken
Alaine
Alpha Blondy
Alborosie
Dennis Alcapone
Alkaline
Alozade
Alpha & Omega
Roland Alphonso
Althea & Donna
Al Anderson
Lynford Anderson (a.k.a. "Andy Capp")
Bob Andy
Horace Andy
Mike Anthony
Patrick Andy
Anthony B
Apache Indian
De Apostle
Arise Roots
Marlon Asher
Aswad
Audio Active

B

Baba Brooks 
Baby Cham
Baby Wayne
Ballyhoo!
Billy Boyo 
Bad Brains
Admiral Bailey
Spanner Banner
Buju Banton
Burro Banton
Mega Banton
Pato Banton
Starkey Banton
Dave Barker
Lloyd Barnes
Aston Barrett
Carlton Barrett
Theophilus Beckford
Bedouin Soundclash
Beenie Man
Nayanka Bell
Lorna Bennett
Spragga Benz
Beshara
Big Joe
Big Mountain
Big Youth
Barry Biggs
Black Roots
The Black Seeds
Black Slate
The Blackstones
Black Uhuru
Everton Blender
Alpha Blondy
Blue Riddim Band
The Blues Busters
Yami Bolo
Usain Bolt
Bongo Herman
Barry Boom
Ken Boothe
Born Jamericans
Bounty Killer
Dennis Bovell (a.k.a. Blackbeard)
Andru Branch
Brick & Lace
Annette Brissett
Peter Broggs
Cedric Brooks
Mike Brooks
Barry Brown
Dennis Brown
Foxy Brown
Glen Brown
Junior Brown
Prezident Brown
U Brown
Buccaneer
Bumpin Uglies
Burning Spear
Bushman
Busy Signal
Junior Byles

C

The Cables
Susan Cadogan
Al Campbell
Cornell Campbell
Don Campbell
Icho Candy
Capleton
Captain Sinbad
Don Carlos
Carlton and The Shoes
Lacksley Castell
Chalice
The Chantells
Charlie Chaplin
Charly B
Lloyd Charmers
Tessanne Chin
Tony Chin
The Chosen Few
Christafari
Chronixx
Geoffrey Chung
Mikey Chung
Tami Chynn
Cidade Negra
The Cimarons
The Clarendonians
Augustus "Gussie" Clarke
Johnny Clarke
Jimmy Cliff
Cocoa Tea
Stranger Cole
Colle´ Kharis
Collie Buddz
Ansell Collins
Common Kings
The Congos
Hollie Cook
Joseph Cotton
Count Ossie
Tommy Cowan
Culcha Candela
Cultura Profética
Culture

D

Daab
Danny Red
Daddy Freddy
Daddy Screw
Tonton David
Da'Ville
Ronnie Davis
Nora Dean
Desmond Dekker
Del Arno Band
Junior Delgado
Chaka Demus & Pliers
Dillinger
Phyllis Dillon
Dirty Heads
Dobby Dobson
Eric Donaldson
Dr Alimantado
Tyrone Downie
The Drastics
Mikey Dread
Don Drummond
Dry & Heavy
Dub FX
Dub Inc. 
Dubmatix
Lucky Dube
Sly Dunbar
Errol Dunkley
The Dynamites

E

Earl Flute
Earl Sixteen
Echo Movement
Clint Eastwood
Clint Eastwood & General Saint
Easy Star All*Stars
Clancy Eccles
Jackie Edwards
Rupie Edwards
Eek-A-Mouse
Elephant Man
El General
Alton Ellis
Hortense Ellis
The Elovaters
Junior English
The Ethiopians
Etana
The Expanders
The Expendables

F

Jermaine Fagan
Tiken Jah Fakoly
Majek Fashek
Father Goose Music
Fathead
Benjamin Faya
Chuck Fenda
Robert Ffrench
Edi Fitzroy
Sharon Forrester
Fortunate Youth
Michael Franti & Spearhead
Dean Fraser
Lutan Fyah
Fantan Mojah

G

Boris Gardiner
Gaudi
The Gaylads
General Echo
General Levy
General Trees
Gentleman
Sophia George
Giant Panda Guerilla Dub Squad
The Gladiators
Deborahe Glasgow
Edson Gomes
Vin Gordon
Eddy Grant
Rudy Grant
Owen Gray
The Green
Winston Grennan
Greyhound
Marcia Griffiths
Winston Groovy
Groundation
Gyptian

H

Haha
Half Pint
Audrey Hall
Beres Hammond
Derrick Harriott
Josh Heinrichs
The Heptones
Herbs
Lennie Hibbert
Joe Higgs
Joseph Hill
Justin Hinds
The Hippy Boys
Errol Holt
John Holt
Honey Boy
Keith Hudson
Peter Hunnigale
Clive Hunt
Sheila Hylton

I

Ijahman Levi
Inner Circle
I-Roy
Ismaël Isaac
I-Threes
The In Crowd
Iration
Irie Maffia
Tippa Irie
Welton Irie
Devon Irons
Gregory Isaacs
Israel Vibration
The Itals
I-Wayne
Iya Terra

J

Jah Cure
Jah Lion a.k.a. Jah Lloyd
Jah Mason
Jah Roots
Jah Shaka
Jah Stitch
Jah Woosh
Jah Warrior
David Jahson
Winston Jarrett
J.O.E.
John Brown's Body
Lyndon John X
Anthony Johnson
Linton Kwesi Johnson
Vivian Jones
Judge Dread

K

Katchafire
Kalaeloa
Israel Kamakawiwoʻole
Janet Kay
Ini Kamoze
Junior Kelly
Pat Kelly
Kiddus I
Diana King
Jigsy King
King Django
King Sounds
King Stitt
King Tubby
Sean Kingston
Knowledge
Koffee (singer)
Konshens
Kranium

L

L.A.B.
Lady G
Lady Saw
Eric "Bingy Bunny" Lamont
Byron Lee
Phillip Leo
Exco Levi
Barrington Levy
Hopeton Lewis
Aura Lewis
Lieutenant Stitchie
Little Hero
Little John
Little Kevin
Little Roy
Dandy Livingstone
Jah Lloyd
Fred Locks
Locomondo
June Lodge
Jimmy London
Lone Ranger
Long Beach Dub All-Stars
Long Beach Shortbus
Luciano

M

Macka B
Maxi Priest
Mad Cobra
David Madden
Mad Lion
Mad Professor
Mafia & Fluxy
Magic!
Carl Malcolm
Bob Marley
Damian "Junior Gong" Marley
Julian Marley
Ky-Mani Marley
Rita Marley
Stephen Marley
Ziggy Marley
Steven "Lenky" Marsden
Larry Marshall
Wayne Marshall
Junior Marvin
Jah Mason
Massive Dread
Matisyahu
Matumbi
Mavado
The Maytals
The Maytones
Tommy McCook
Freddie McGregor
Freddie McKay
Bitty McLean
Enos McLeod
The Meditations
The Melodians
Mellow Mood
Merger
Peter Metro
The Mexicano
Me & You
Michigan & Smiley
Midnite
The Mighty Diamonds
 Mighty Mystic
Mikey Dread
Jacob Miller
Millie
Sugar Minott
Mishka
Misty in Roots
Jackie Mittoo
Fantan Mojah
Derrick Morgan
Morgan Heritage
The Morwells
Pablo Moses
Judy Mowatt
The Movement
Mr. Vegas
Hugh Mundell
Junior Murvin
Mungo's Hi Fi
Musical Youth
Mutabaruka
Cedric Myton

N

Fidel Nadal
Nando Boom
Johnny Nash
Natty Nation
Natural Vibrations ("Natty Vibes")
Natiruts
Natural Black
New Kingston
Nicodemus
Nigger Kojak
Ninjaman
Nitty Gritty
George Nooks
No-Maddz

O

Oku Onuora
Opihi Pickers
Jackie Opel
O Rappa
O-Shen
Johnny Osbourne

P

Augustus Pablo
Triston Palma
Pan Head
Papa Dee
Papa San
The Paragons
Ken Parker
Lloyd Parks
Passafire
Frankie Paul
Sean Paul
Dawn Penn
Pepper
Lee "Scratch" Perry
Pinchers
Dwight Pinkney
The Pioneers
Pliers
Jukka Poika
Popcaan
Maxi Priest
Prince Allah
Prince Buster
Prince Far I
Prince Jazzbo
Prince Lincoln Thompson
Prince Mohammed
Professor Nuts
Michael Prophet
Protoje
The Pyramids

Q

Finley Quaye
Queen Ifrica
Queen Omega

R

Raappana
Ernest Ranglin
Ranking Dread
Ranking Joe
Ranking Roger
Ranking Trevor
Cutty Ranks
Gappy Ranks
Shabba Ranks
The Rastafarians
RAS-1
Ras Michael
Ras Midas
Ras Mohammed
Ras Shiloh
Rayvon
Tony Rebel
Rebelution
Red Dragon
Red Rat
Winston Reedy
Junior Reid
The Revolutionaries
Rhythm & Sound
Cynthia Richards
Jimmy Riley
Tarrus Riley
Winston Riley
Johnny Ringo
Rico Rodriguez
Max Romeo
Gene Rondo
The Roots Radics
Levi Roots
Michael Rose
The Royals
The Rudies
Bruce Ruffin
Devon Russell

S

Natasja Saad
Sams'K Le Jah
Sanchez
Scientist
Errol Scorcher
Scotty
Screwdriver
B.B. Seaton
Seeed
The Selecter
Serani
Sevana
Shaggy
Bim Sherman
Pluto Shervington
Shinehead
Roy Shirley
Shrub
Garnett Silk
The Silvertones
Simplicity
Sister Carol
Sister Nancy
Sizzla
The Slackers
Slightly Stoopid
The Slickers
Sly and Robbie
Leroy Smart
Smiley Culture
Earl "Chinna" Smith
Ernie Smith
Mikey Smith
Slim Smith
Wayne Smith
Snoop Lion
Snow
SOJA
Soul Syndicate
Soul Rebels Brass Band
The Specials
Spectacular
Spice
Mikey Spice
Richie Spice
Steel Pulse
Steely & Clevie
Richie Stephens
Tanya Stephens
Duane Stephenson
Lester Sterling
Roman Stewart
Tinga Stewart
Stick Figure
Sublime
Super Cat
Symarip

T

311
Lynn Taitt
The Tamlins
Rod Taylor
The Techniques
The Tennors
Thievery Corporation
Tenor Saw
Tiger
Third World
Jah Thomas
Nicky Thomas
Caroll Thompson
Kemar Thompson (a.k.a. "Noncowa" and "Jr. Pinchers")
Lincoln Thompson
Linval Thompson
Eddie Thornton (a.k.a. "Tan Tan")
Through The Roots
T.O.K.
Tomorrows Bad Seeds
Toots & the Maytals
Andrew Tosh
Peter Tosh
Toyan
Tradition
Tribal Seeds
Tribo de Jah
Trinity
Tropical Depression
Tropidelic
Twenty One Pilots
Junior Tucker
Twinkle Brothers

U

UB40
The Uniques
Unity Pacific
The Upsetters
U-Roy

V

Vavamuffin
Vibronics
The Viceroys
Romain Virgo
Voice Mail
Vybz Kartel

W

Warrior King
Wayne Wade
Bunny Wailer
The Wailers (Bob Marley & The Wailers)
The Wailing Souls
Josey Wales
Leroy Wallace
Ward 21
E.T. Webster
Caron Wheeler
Wayne Rhoden
Worl-A-Girl
Willi Williams
Delroy Wilson
Wingless Angels
Wayne Wonder
Word, Sound and Power
Winston Wright

Y

Yabby You
Yellowman

Z

Zap Pow
Benjamin Zephaniah
Earl Zero
Zion Train
Zox
Tapper Zukie

See Also
Lists of musicians

References

Reggae